The giants' grave of Is Concias (also called Sa Dom'è s'Orcu) is an archaeological site of Quartucciu, municipality of the metropolitan City of Cagliari.

Located on the western slope of the Sette Fratelli mountains, the tomb, dated to the middle and late Bronze Age, has, like most other tombs of the giants of southern Sardinia, the so-called "rows façade". At the center of the exedra, about 10 meters wide, there is the entrance to the burial chamber about 8 meters long and 1.30 m wide approx. The height of the burial chamber decreases from a maximum of 2.10 m at the entrance to a minimum of 1.70 m on the bottom.

Outside, on the right side of the entrance, there is a "betile", probably a deity.

External links
Quartucciu, Tomba di giganti Is Concias
TOMBA DEI GIGANTI DI IS CONCIAS, Quartucciu

Buildings and structures in Sardinia
Megalithic monuments in Italy
Tourist attractions in Sardinia
Archaeological sites in Sardinia